HRRC may refer to:

 Home Recording Rights Coalition
 Housatonic Railroad, a Class III railroad operating in southwestern New England and New York